Alain Lewuillon (born 27 February 1953) is a Belgian former rower. He competed at the 1988 Summer Olympics and the 1992 Summer Olympics.

References

External links
 
 

1953 births
Living people
Belgian male rowers
Olympic rowers of Belgium
Rowers at the 1988 Summer Olympics
Rowers at the 1992 Summer Olympics
People from Ixelles
Sportspeople from Brussels
20th-century Belgian people